Stars of the Summer Night may refer to one of the following:

Stars of the Summer Night (song), a song by Isaac B. Woodbury
Stars of the Summer Night (album), an album by Jo Stafford